Barrett Buttress is a nunatak rising to  at the south margin of Goodenough Glacier,  southwest of the Blanchard Nunataks in western Palmer Land. It was mapped by the United States Geological Survey from U.S. Navy aerial photographs taken 1966–69, and was named by the UK Antarctic Place-Names Committee in 1977 after Richard G. Barrett, a British Antarctic Survey surveyor at Stonington Island and Adelaide Island stations, 1974–76.

References 

Nunataks of Palmer Land